Shane Robin Hill (born 2 December 1965 in Kalgoorlie, Western Australia) is an Australian politician. He represented the electorate of Geraldton in the Western Australian Legislative Assembly from the 2001 election for the Labor Party until losing the seat in the 2008 election.

Hill defeated the sitting Liberal member, Bob Bloffwitch, in the 2001 state election. In the 2005 state election Hill held the seat by a margin of 2.7%.

Hill was a member of the standing committee for Health and Education from 2001 to 2005. He has also been a member of the Joint Parliamentary Services Committee since 2001 and a member of the Community Development and Justice Standing Committee since 2005.

In 2006 Hill was appointed to be the Government Whip of the Legislative Assembly.

In the 2008 election, Hill's seat was significantly altered.  He'd previously held one of Labor's more marginal seats, but the redistribution gave the Liberals a notional three-percent majority.  He was soundly defeated by Liberal challenger Ian Blayney.

Hill was preselected as the Labor candidate for Durack at the 2010 federal election, at which he was unsuccessful, and was also unsuccessful as the Labor candidate for North West Central at the 2017 state election.

References 

1965 births
Living people
Members of the Western Australian Legislative Assembly
People from Kalgoorlie
Australian Labor Party members of the Parliament of Western Australia
21st-century Australian politicians